Frazier Othel Thompson III (born July 3, 1980), better known by his stage name Trae tha Truth (or simply Trae), is an American rapper and record executive from Houston, Texas. Embarking on a musical career in 1998, he soon established himself as a prominent member of the Texas hip hop scene with his solo debut, Losing Composure (2003). Same Thing Different Day (2004) and Restless (2006) followed up, the latter of which was his debut on Rap-a-Lot Records.

In total, Trae has released 11 solo studio albums, as well as 26 mixtapes and two albums as a part of the duo Assholes by Nature (ABN) with longtime friend and frequent collaborator Z-Ro. Trae is also known for his I'm On series of singles, which have featured a number of prominent artists since the first installment in 2011. He is currently signed to fellow southern hip hop artist T.I.'s Grand Hustle Records, where he was appointed the title of vice president (VP) in 2017.

In addition to his music career, Thompson is known for his activism and philanthropy as the founder of both Angel by Nature, a charity aimed at helping the impoverished youth of Texas, and Relief Gang, a non-profit organisation initially formed to help the people of Houston and the surrounding areas rebuild their homes, as well as provide shelter, food and education in the wake of 2017's Hurricane Harvey. Since forming, the group have expanded to provide aid to people in Louisiana, Mississippi, Puerto Rico, and other areas affected by natural disasters. Thompson's work has led to him being referred to as Houston's "Hometown Hero", and from 2008 onwards, July 22 has officially been recognised as "Trae Day" in Houston.

Life and career
Trae tha Truth gained exposure on the Houston rap scene in 1998, when he made his rapping debut with a guest appearance on Z-Ro's album Look What You Did to Me. In 2003, he began his solo career with the album Losing Composure. 2004's Same Thing Different Day, 2006's Restless,  and 2007's Life Goes On followed shortly after. Trae Tha Truth has also worked relentlessly with fellow Houston rapper Chamillionaire on his various Mixtape Messiah series.

He also collaborated with Z-Ro to form the duo ABN or Assholes by Nature. They have released two albums, Assholes by Nature (2003) and It Is What It Is (2008).

Trae Tha Truth was involved in a fight with Texas rapper Mike Jones at the 2008 Ozone Awards. It was recently suspected that Trae Tha Truth's music was banned from Houston's local radio Station, 97.9 The Boxx.

After creating a buzz for himself, T.I. announced that he had signed Trae Tha Truth to Grand Hustle Records on March 1, 2012. On October 9, 2012, Trae was featured on the annual BET Hip Hop Awards cypher, alongside his Grand Hustle label-mates Iggy Azalea, B.o.B, Chip and T.I. His first Grand Hustle album, then-titled Banned, was scheduled to be released in 2014. However, prior to that he was involved in the recording process for the Grand Hustle Records compilation album. His Grand Hustle Records debut titled Tha Truth was released on  July 24, 2015.

Honors
In 2008, Trae Tha Truth was awarded by the mayor of Houston, Bill White, and Council Member Peter Brown with his own day, Trae Day, in honor of his outstanding work within the community. This is the first time the honor has been extended to a rap artist. Trae Day is celebrated every year on July 22.

On May 23, 2021, Trae received the Change Maker Award at that year's Billboard Music Awards. The award, according to Billboard, pays tribute to "the artist or group that speaks truth to power through their music, celebrity, and community. They are socially conscious, politically aware, active in their community and charitable with time, money and/or influence to improve the lives of others."

Philanthropy
During Hurricane Harvey in September 2017 Trae and his friends, dubbed the "Relief Gang", spent a full day driving trucks and SUVs around the Houston area helping get residents to safety. They worked in Beaumont, Winnie, Kingwood, and Cleveland Texas - all areas where flooding was severe.

In October 2017, Trae hosted a fundraiser for a Houston area grandma attacked and carjacked at a gas station.

In late 2020, Trae and his non-profit organization Relief Gang handed out clothing including jackets and face masks for the homeless.

Controversy
Trae Tha Truth hosted the second annual Trae Day in July 2009, near Texas Southern University. After the event had ended, eight people, ranging in age from 14 to 21, were shot near a parking garage located on the Texas Southern University campus. When he explained to the morning crew at radio station KBXX "97.9 The Box" that he did not condone the shooting, he was accused by one of the personalities of being responsible for the violence per the lyrical content.  When Trae Tha Truth retaliated against her on a mixtape, KBXX banned Trae Tha Truth's music and contributed music from the station and ordered their personalities not to play his music.  It caused backlash in the music community as several DJs at KBXX were terminated from their positions due to playing songs that featured Trae.  Due to his inability and hindrance from being able to promote his music in Houston as a result, Trae filed a lawsuit against KBXX early in 2010 citing damages to his career.

On July 15, 2020, Trae among 87 people were arrested in Breonna Taylor protest in Louisville, Kentucky; he was among two rappers alongside YBN Cordae in a protest to be arrested.

On September 2, 2022, a viral video obtained by TMZ, shows Trae attacking Z-Ro with the rest of his crew, during 50 Cent’s TYCOON weekend. This comes after Trae denied on his Instagram page following the altercation and previous footage that went viral, that Z-Ro was not outnumbered in the fight.

Shooting
On June 20, 2012, Trae tha Truth was shot in the shoulder following a performance at an afterhours club located at 9850 Westpark Drive, Houston, TX. His friend, Carlos Durell "Dinky D" Dorsey, died at the scene along with 30-year-old Erica Rochelle Dotson and the intended target, Coy "Poppa C" Thompson (not related to Trae). There were around 20 gunshots fired. In a December 2012 interview with MTV, Trae said that he had been left lying and bleeding at the hospital for hours after being brought in. He went on to say that he "didn't get no bandage, I ain't get no stitches, they didn't take the bullet out, none of that."

On July 4, 2012, it was reported that a suspect, Feanyichi Ezekwesi Uvukansi, had been arrested and charged with capital murder for the shooting. He was later convicted of capital murder and sentenced to life without parole.

On November 25, 2013, Trae released a mixtape titled I Am King, as a tribute to Dominic "Money Clip D" Brown.

On January 18, 2017, Trae uploaded a video to Instagram showing himself pushing the bullet out of his shoulder.

Discography

Studio albums
Losing Composure (2003)
Same Thing Different Day (2004)
Restless (2006)
Life Goes On (2007)
The Beginning (2008)
Street King (2011)
Tha Truth (2015)
Tha Truth, Pt. 2 (2016)
The Truth, Pt. 3 (2017)
Hometown Hero (2018)
Exhale (2019)
Truth Season: The United Streets of America (2022)

References

External links

1980 births
Living people
African-American male rappers
African-American songwriters
American shooting survivors
Gangsta rappers
Grand Hustle Records artists
Rappers from Houston
Songwriters from Texas
Screwed Up Click members
Southern hip hop musicians
21st-century American rappers
21st-century American male musicians
21st-century philanthropists
Hip hop activists
American music industry executives
21st-century African-American musicians
20th-century African-American people
American male songwriters